Natore Government Boys' High School is a secondary school in Natore Sadar Upazila of Natore District that was established in 1910 and nationalized by the Education ministry of Bangladesh in 1968. Before its nationalization, the school was known as Jinnah High School.

In 2015 the school become digital, and it now runs its all institutional activity by web-based education management system. The school's present plan is to run all activity by using computer software.

References

External  links
 

Boys' schools in Bangladesh
High schools in Bangladesh
Buildings and structures in Rajshahi Division
Educational institutions established in 1910
Schools in Natore District
1910 establishments in British India